Barzani is a surname. Notable people with the surname include:
 Adham Barzani (born 1962), Iraqi Kurdish politician
 Ahmed Barzani (1896–1969), head of the Barzani tribe in Northern Iraq
 Asenath Barzani (1590–1670), Jewish Iraqi writer
 Ayoub Barzani, Kurdish Iraqi writer and critic
 Idris Barzani (1944–1987), first Kurd to ever fly a plane
 Massoud Barzani (born 1946), leader of the Kurdistan Democratic Party, President of Iraqi Kurdistan 2005–2017, son of Mustafa Barzani
 Masrour Barzani (born 1969), son of Masoud Barzani, member of the Kurdistan Democratic Party leadership
 Moshe Barazani or Barzani (1926–1947), Jewish Kurdish member of Lehi (the "Stern Gang")
 Mustafa Barzani (1903–1979), leader and founder of the Kurdistan Democratic Party 1946–1979
 Nechirvan Barzani (born 1966), (Prime Minister of Iraqi Kurdistan) 2012–present, nephew of Mustafa Barzani
 Sirwan Barzani, Kurdish businessman and military commander
 Ubaidullah Barzani (1927–1980) was a Minister of State in the Iraqi government in 1974 to 1987

See also
 Barzani (disambiguation)